"No Te Quiero Nada" is a song by American duo Ha*Ash. It was first included on Ha*Ash third studio album Habitación Doble (2008) where it was released on July 8, 2008 as the first single and then included on their live albums Primera Fila: Hecho Realidad (2014) and Ha*Ash: En Vivo (2019).

A live version featuring Argentine singer Axel it was released through Sony Music Latin on 15 September 2015 as the fifth single from album, Primera Fila: Hecho Realidad. The song was written by Áureo Baqueiro.

Music video 
A music video for "No Te Quiero Nada" was published on her YouTube channel on October 25, 2009.  , the video has over 89 million views on YouTube.

The second music video for "No Te Quiero Nada" recorded live for his album A Tiempo (DVD) was released on August 1, 2011.

The third video for "No Te Quiero Nada", recorded live for the live album Ha*Ash: En Vivo, was released on December 6, 2019. The video was filmed in Auditorio Nacional, Mexico City.

Commercial performance 
The track peaked at number 6 in the Latin Pop Songs, number 14 in the Hot Latin songs and at number 14 in the Latin Airplay charts in the United States. In Mexico, the song peaked at number 7 on the Monitor Latino and at number 31 in the Mexico Espanol Airplay. In Spain, the song peaked at number 50 on the PROMUSICAE.

Cover versions 
On 2017, Mexican Singer Karol Sevilla posted a cover of the song on YouTube.

Credits and personnel 
Credits adapted from AllMusic.

Recording and management

 Recording Country: México
 Sony / ATV Discos Music Publishing LLC / Westwood Publishing
 (P) 2014 Sony Music Entertainment US Latin LLC
 Published by: Brava! Songs
 Published by: Warner Chappell Music Publishing

Ha*Ash
 Ashley Grace  – vocals, guitar
 Hanna Nicole  – vocals, guitar, piano
Additional personnel
 Áureo Baqueiro; – producer, engingeer, chorus, songwriting
 Ricardo Calderón  – photography

Charts

Awards and nominations

Version Primera fila: Hecho realidad 

"No Te Quiero Nada" is the fifth single of the live album Primera Fila: Hecho Realidad by American duo Ha*Ash featuring Argentina singer Axel. The single was officially released on September 15, 2015. The track peaked at number one on the Monitor Latino on México. The song was certified gold in México.

The music video of the song is the live performance by Ha*Ash in Lake Charles, Louisiana. A music video for "No Te Quiero Nada" was released on May 1, 2015. It was directed by Nahuel Lerena. The video was filmed in Lake Charles, Louisiana, United States. , the video has over 49 million views on YouTube.

Credits and personnel 
Credits adapted from AllMusic.

Recording and management

 Recording Country: United States
 Sony / ATV Discos Music Publishing LLC / Westwood Publishing
 (P) 2014 Sony Music Entertainment México, S.A. De C.V.

Ha*Ash
 Ashley Grace  – vocals, guitar
 Hanna Nicole  – vocals, guitar

Additional personnel
 Axel  – vocals, guitar
 Áureo Baqueiro  – songwriting
 Pablo De La Loza  – co-productor.
 George Noriega  – producer
 Tim Mitchell  – producer

Charts and certifications

Release history

References 

Ha*Ash songs
2008 singles
2008 songs
2015 singles
Songs written by Áureo Baqueiro
Song recordings produced by Áureo Baqueiro
Song recordings produced by George Noriega
Song recordings produced by Tim Mitchell
Spanish-language songs
Pop ballads
Sony Music Latin singles
2010s ballads
Monitor Latino Top General number-one singles